Rock in Rio is a recurring music festival originating in Rio de Janeiro, Brazil. It later branched into other locations such as Lisbon, Madrid and Las Vegas.

Nine incarnations of the festival have been held in Rio de Janeiro, in 1985, 1991, 2001, 2011, 2013, 2015, 2017, 2019 and 2022, nine in Lisbon, in 2004, 2006, 2008, 2010, 2012, 2014, 2016, 2018 and 2022, three in Madrid in 2008, 2010 and 2012 and one in Las Vegas, in 2015. Brazilian entrepreneur and advertiser Roberto Medina was responsible for the inception and organization of the festival, as well as moving the 2004 edition to Lisbon, while controversially keeping the brand "Rock in Rio". In 2011, Rock in Rio returned to its original location, Rio de Janeiro, with a new line-up of singers and groups.

Rock in Rio is one of the largest music festivals in the world, with 1.38 million people attending the first event, 700,000 attending the second and fourth, about 1.2 million attending the third, and about 350,000 people attending each of the three Lisbon events.

In May 2018, Live Nation Entertainment acquired a majority stake in the festival (including from previous stakeholder SFX Entertainment), with Medina continuing to manage the festival's operations. Live Nation stated that it intended to "[integrate] their industry expertise" into their overall business.

In 2022, two editions are already confirmed. Lisbon will host the 9th edition in 18, 19, 25 and 26 of June at Bela Vista Park. Rio de Janeiro will host its edition in 2, 3, 4 and 8, 9, 10, 11 of September.

History

Rio de Janeiro

Rock in Rio (1985)

The first edition of the festival was held from January 11–20, 1985. Queen, George Benson, Rod Stewart, AC/DC, and Yes were the headliners, each occupying top spot for two nights (Benson, however, ceded it to James Taylor for their second night in the same bill, due to the huge delay Taylor's extended performance had caused to his concert two days before). About 1.38 million people attended the 10-day-long festival.

Rock in Rio in numbers 
 The City of Rock, which was built for the festival, covered an area of 250,000 m2 (around 2.7 million square feet)
 1,600,000 litres of beverages were served, using 4 million plastic cups.
 900,000 hamburgers.
 500,000 pizza slices.
 McDonald's sold 58,000 hamburgers in a single day, which was a Guinness World Record until the fourth edition in 2011, where 79,000 hamburgers were sold by Bob's.

The full list of artists who performed at Rock in Rio:

 11/01 Friday
 Queen
 Iron Maiden
 Whitesnake
 Baby Consuelo e Pepeu Gomes
 Erasmo Carlos
 Ney Matogrosso
 12/01 Saturday
 George Benson
 James Taylor
 Al Jarreau
 Gilberto Gil
 Elba Ramalho
 Ivan Lins
 13/01 Sunday
 Rod Stewart
 The Go-Go's
 Nina Hagen
 Blitz
 Lulu Santos
 Os Paralamas do Sucesso

 14/01 Monday
 James Taylor
 George Benson
 Alceu Valença
 Moraes Moreira
 15/01 Tuesday
 AC/DC
 Scorpions
 Barão Vermelho
 Eduardo Dusek
 Kid Abelha e os Abóboras Selvagens
 16/01 Wednesday
 Rod Stewart
 Ozzy Osbourne
 Rita Lee
 Moraes Moreira
 Os Paralamas do Sucesso
 17/01 Thursday
 Yes
 Al Jarreau
 Elba Ramalho
 Alceu Valença

 18/01 Friday
 Queen
 The Go-Go's
 The B-52's (with Chris Frantz and Tina Weymouth)
 Lulu Santos
 Eduardo Dusek
 Kid Abelha e os Abóboras Selvagens
 19/01 Saturday
 AC/DC
 Scorpions
 Ozzy Osbourne
 Whitesnake
 Baby Consuelo e Pepeu Gomes

 20/01 Sunday
 Yes
 The B-52's (with Chris Frantz and Tina Weymouth)
 Nina Hagen
 Blitz
 Gilberto Gil
 Barão Vermelho
 Erasmo Carlos

 Both Queen shows were filmed (early on January 12 and January 19) and broadcast throughout Brazil by Globo. Each show was watched by nearly 200 million people in over 60 countries and in front of 80,000–100,000 people for each night setting a world record for the biggest paying audience ever at the time. It was later broadcast in the United States on MTV as "Queen: Live in Rio".
 Iron Maiden was the only non-Brazilian act to play just one concert at the festival (on its opening night, headlined by Queen), due to other bookings, while every other international act performed twice. During the song "Revelations", lead singer Bruce Dickinson hit himself accidentally with a guitar and cut his eyebrow. Dickinson continued to sing in spite of heavy bleeding. They performed in front of a crowd of 100,000 people.
 The Go-Go's broke up after their two Rock in Rio performances, (headlined by Queen and Rod Stewart) though they would later reunite in the 1990s. The two Rock in Rio shows were the debut and swansong for short-tenured Go-Go's member Paula Jean Brown, who had replaced Jane Wiedlin. (Wiedlin would return to the reunited 1990s lineup.)
 Chris Frantz and Tina Weymouth, at the time Talking Heads drummer and bass player, respectively, took part at the B-52's concerts. They joined the band from the third song on and played along with them for the remainder of the performance.
 The January 20 appearance of the B-52's would turn out to be their last with guitarist Ricky Wilson, who died from AIDS in October of that year as the band was finishing their next album.
 Initially, Def Leppard was scheduled to play at the festival. However, they dropped out about two months before the event, due to delays on the recording process of the album Hysteria. Eleven days before the date Def Leppard would have played at the festival, drummer Rick Allen suffered an accident that cost him his left arm. They were replaced by Whitesnake.

Rock in Rio 2 (1991)
The second edition was held from January 18–27, 1991 at the Maracanã stadium. Headliners were Guns N' Roses, Prince and George Michael, each being top billed for two of the event's nine nights. INXS, New Kids on the Block and A-ha also had top billing, for one night each. Guns N' Roses attracted more than 100.000 people to the stadium to see their Sunday performance, while a-ha's audience numbered 100.000 people.

Full list of artists who performed at Rock in Rio 2:

 

 18/01 Friday
 Prince
 Joe Cocker
 Colin Hay
 Jimmy Cliff
 19/01 Saturday
 INXS
 Billy Idol
 Carlos Santana
 Engenheiros do Hawaii
 Supla
 Vid & Sangue Azul
 20/01 Sunday
 Guns N' Roses
 Billy Idol
 Faith No More
 Titãs
 Hanoi Hanoi

 22/01 Tuesday
 New Kids on the Block
 Run-DMC
 Roupa Nova
 Inimigos do Rei
 23/01 Wednesday
 Guns N' Roses
 Judas Priest
 Queensrÿche
 Megadeth
 Lobão
 Sepultura
 24/01 Thursday
 Prince
 Carlos Santana
 Alceu Valença
 Laura Finocchiaro
 Serguei

 25/01 Friday
 George Michael
 Deee-Lite
 Elba Ramalho
 Ed Motta
 26/01 Saturday
 A-ha
 Happy Mondays
 Paulo Ricardo
 Debbie Gibson
 Information Society
 Capital Inicial
 Nenhum de Nós
 27/01 Sunday
 George Michael
 Lisa Stansfield
 Deee-Lite
 Moraes Moreira e Pepeu Gomes
 Léo Jaime

Guns N' Roses's January 20 concert was their first ever with then new drummer Matt Sorum and keyboard player Dizzy Reed. George Michael's second concert, on January 27, the festival's closing day, featured his ex-Wham! partner Andrew Ridgeley, who joined Michael for a few songs at the encore. Again a misplaced Brazilian act suffered from bad reception, with Lobão being pelted with beer cans and being forced to cut his performance short.

Rock in Rio 3 (2001)

The third Rock in Rio festival took place in 2001. Its seven nights were headlined, respectively, by Sting, R.E.M., Guns N' Roses, 'N Sync, Iron Maiden, Neil Young and the Red Hot Chili Peppers.

Iron Maiden released their set as Rock in Rio. Profits from the sale of the album were donated to the Clive Burr fund, helping their former drummer pay mounting medical bills for his multiple sclerosis.

A notable appearance at Rock in Rio 3 was that of American hard rock band Guns N' Roses, with a new line-up featuring guitarist Buckethead, original member and singer Axl Rose (vocals), and longtime member Dizzy Reed (keyboards). "I have no intention, and I never did, of denying you all something you enjoyed," Rose told the audience. "And I thought it was only fair for you to see that this new band can play the fuck out of these songs. It's very hard to ask a musician to learn to play the part or parts played by other musicians before that. These guys here have worked very hard."

Carlinhos Brown, the opening act on the day Guns N' Roses performed, was attacked by water bottles throughout his performance. Bassist Nick Oliveri of Queens of the Stone Age performed nude for part of their set and was arrested for indecent exposure after the concert, being released soon after.

Full list of artists who performed at Rock in Rio 3:

 12/01 Friday
 Sting
 Daniela Mercury
 James Taylor
 Milton Nascimento
 Gilberto Gil
 Orquestra Sinfônica Brasileira
 13/01 Saturday
 R.E.M.
 Foo Fighters
 Beck
 Barão Vermelho
 Fernanda Abreu
 Cássia Eller
 14/01 Sunday
 Guns N' Roses
 Oasis
 Papa Roach
 Ira! & Ultraje a Rigor
 Carlinhos Brown
 Pato Fu

 18/01 Thursday
 'N Sync
 Britney Spears
 5ive
 Sandy & Junior
 Aaron Carter
 Moraes Moreira
 19/01 Friday
 Iron Maiden
 Rob Halford
 Sepultura
 Queens of the Stone Age
 Pavilhão 9
 Sheik Tosado

 20/01 Saturday
 Neil Young
 Sheryl Crow
 Dave Matthews Band
 Kid Abelha
 Elba Ramalho & Zé Ramalho
 Engenheiros do Hawaii
 21/01 Sunday
 Red Hot Chili Peppers
 Silverchair
 Capital Inicial
 Deftones
 O Surto
 Diesel

Rock in Rio 4 (2011)

The fourth edition of Rock in Rio, back to its origins, was held on September 23, 24, 25, 29 and 30, and October 1 and 2, 2011, at an area (pt) to be built next to the old City of Rock – which is currently the site of the Olympic Village of the 2016 Summer Olympics.

Three different stages were employed, with the headlining concerts at the Palco Mundo (World Stage), the secondary ones in Palco Sunset (Sunset Stage), and DJs playing at a specialized stage for electronic music. The closing acts, Guns N' Roses and System of a Down, entered following a poll on the festival's website. Maroon 5 was a last hour addition, following Jay-Z leaving for personal reasons.

Full list of artists who performed at Rock in Rio 4:
09/23 Friday
Palco Mundo: Rihanna, Elton John, Katy Perry, Claudia Leitte, opening concert with Os Paralamas do Sucesso, Titãs, Milton Nascimento, Maria Gadú and the Brazilian Symphony Orchestra
Palco Sunset: Móveis Coloniais de Acaju, Orkestra Rumpilezz, Mariana Aydar, Bebel Gilberto, Sandra de Sá, Ed Motta, Rui Veloso, Andreas Kisser, The Asteroids Galaxy Tour, The Gift
09/24 Saturday
Palco Mundo: Red Hot Chili Peppers, Snow Patrol, Capital Inicial, Stone Sour, NX Zero
Palco Sunset: Marcelo Yuka (pt), Cibelle, Karina Buhr, Amora Pêra (Sandra Pêra), Tulipa Ruiz, Nação Zumbi, Milton Nascimento, Esperanza Spalding, Mike Patton/Mondo Cane, Orquestra Sinfônica de Heliópolis
09/25 Sunday
Palco Mundo: Metallica, Slipknot, Motörhead, Coheed and Cambria, Gloria
Palco Sunset: Matanza, BNegão (pt), Korzus, The Punk Metal Allstars (East Bay Ray from Dead Kennedys, Mike Clark Suicidal Tendencies, João Gordo from Ratos de Porão and Marcel Schmier from Destruction), Angra, Sepultura, Tarja Turunen, Les Tambours du Bronx
09/29 Thursday
Palco Mundo: Stevie Wonder, Jamiroquai, Kesha, Janelle Monáe, Legião Urbana with Brazilian Symphonic Orchestra
Palco Sunset: Marcelo Jeneci, Curumin, Baile do Simonal, Diogo Nogueira, Afrika Bambaataa, Paula Lima, Joss Stone
09/30 Friday
Palco Mundo: Shakira, Lenny Kravitz, Ivete Sangalo, Jota Quest, Marcelo D2
Palco Sunset: Buraka Som Sistema, Mixhell, Céu, João Donato, Cidade Negra, Martinho da Vila, Emicida, Monobloco, Macaco, Pepeu Gomes
10/1 Saturday
Palco Mundo: Coldplay, Maroon 5, Maná, Skank, Frejat
Palco Sunset: Cidadão Instigado (pt), Júpiter Maçã, Tiê, Jorge Drexler, Zeca Baleiro, Erasmo Carlos, Arnaldo Antunes
10/2 Sunday
Palco Mundo: Guns N' Roses, System of a Down, Evanescence, Detonautas Roque Clube, Pitty
Palco Sunset: The Monomes, David Fonseca, Os Mutantes, Tom Zé, Titãs, Xutos & Pontapés, Marcelo Camelo, The Growlers
Eletrônica Palco: Nalaya Brown

Rock in Rio 5 (2013)
Rock in Rio 5 was held in September 2013. The headline acts, chronologically, were: Beyoncé, Muse, Justin Timberlake, Metallica, Bon Jovi, Bruce Springsteen and Iron Maiden.
Friday 13 September
Palco Mundo: Beyoncé, David Guetta, Ivete Sangalo, Cazuza - O Poeta Está Vivo
Palco Sunset: Living Colour + Angélique Kidjo, Maria Rita + Selah Sue, Vintage Trouble + Jesuton, Flávio Renegado + Orelha Negra
Eletrônica: Otto Knows, Life Is A Loop, Ask 2 Quit, Sweet Beats
Saturday 14 September
Palco Mundo: Muse, Florence and the Machine, Thirty Seconds to Mars, Capital Inicial
Palco Sunset: The Offspring, Viva A Raul Seixas – C/ Detonautas Roque Clube, Zeca Baleiro & Zélia Ducan, Marky Ramone + Michael Graves, BNegão + Autoramas
Eletrônica: TBA, TBA, Anderson Noise, Mau Mau, Paula Chulap
Sunday 15 September
Palco Mundo: Justin Timberlake, Alicia Keys, Jessie J, Jota Quest
Palco Sunset: Ivan Lins + George Benson, Kimbra + Olodum, Nando Reis + Samuel Rosa, Aurea + The Black Samba
Eletrônica: DJ Harvey, dOP, Renato Ratier, Triple Crown
Thursday 19 September
Palco Mundo: Metallica, Alice in Chains, Ghost, Sepultura + Les Tambours du Bronx
Palco Sunset: Rob Zombie, República + Dr. Sin + Roy Z, Sebastian Bach, Almah + Hibria
Eletrônica: Gesaffelstein, Brodinski, The Gaslamp Killer, DJ Ride
Friday 20 September
Palco Mundo: Bon Jovi, Nickelback, Matchbox Twenty, Frejat
Palco Sunset: Ben Harper + Charlie Musselwhite, Grace Potter and the Nocturnals + Donavon Frankenreiter, Mallu Magalhães + Banda Ouro Negro, The Gift + Afroreggae
Eletrônica: Paul Oakenfold, Dexterz, Rodrigo Vieira, Ferris
Saturday 21 September
Palco Mundo: Bruce Springsteen, John Mayer, Phillip Phillips, Skank
Palco Sunset: Gogol Bordello + Lenine, Ivo Meirelles + Fernanda Abreu + Elba Ramalho, Moraes Moreira + Pepeu Gomes + Roberta Sá, Orquestra Imperial + Lorenzo Jovanotti
 Eletrônica: Loco Dice, DJ Vibe, Guti, Flow & Zeo
Sunday 22 September
Palco Mundo: Iron Maiden, Avenged Sevenfold, Slayer, Kiara Rocks
Palco Sunset: Sepultura + Zé Ramalho, Helloween + Kai Hansen, Destruction + Krisiun, Andre Matos + Viper
Eletrônica: Felguk, DJ Marky, Maximum Hedrum, Boteco Electro

Rock in Rio 6 (2015)
The sixth Brazilian edition was held from September 18 to 27, 2015 at the City of Rock. The headliners were Queen + Adam Lambert, Metallica, Rod Stewart, Elton John, System of a Down, Slipknot, Rihanna and Katy Perry.
Friday 18 September
Palco Mundo: Queen + Adam Lambert, OneRepublic, The Script, Rock in Rio 30 Anos
Palco Sunset: Tribute to Cássia Eller, Lenine + Nação Zumbi + Martin Fondse, Ira! + Rappin' Hood and Tony Tornado, Dônica + Arthur Verocai
Eletrônica: DJ Meme, Kerry Chandler, Barbara Tucker, Tribute to Lincoln Olivetti, Tribute to Raul Seixas
Saturday 19 September
Palco Mundo: Metallica, Mötley Crüe, Royal Blood, Gojira
Palco Sunset: Korn, Ministry + Burton C. Bell, Angra + Dee Snider + Doro Pesch, Noturnall + Michael Kiske
Eletrônica: Crookers, Headhunterz, Tropkillaz, A Liga, Chemical Surf
Sunday 20 September
Palco Mundo: Rod Stewart, Elton John, Seal, Os Paralamas do Sucesso
Palco Sunset: John Legend, Magic!, Baby do Brasil, Alice Caymmi + Eumir Deodato
Eletrônica: Matador, Pig and Dan, Gui Boratto, Flow & Zeo ft. Karina Zeviani, Elekfantz
Thursday 24 September
Palco Mundo: System of a Down, Queens of the Stone Age, Hollywood Vampires, CPM 22
Palco Sunset: Deftones, Lamb of God, Halestorm, Project46 + John Wayne
Eletrônica: Vintage Culture, Anderson Noise + Mau Mau + Renato Cohen, 2 Attack (Paula Chalup + Mau Mau)
Friday 25 September
Palco Mundo: Slipknot, Faith No More, Mastodon, De La Tierra
Palco Sunset: Steve Vai + Camerata Florianópolis, Nightwish + Tony Kakko, Moonspell + Derrick Green, Clássicos do Terror
Eletrônica: Alok, Felguk, Marcelo Cic, Volkoder, Hnqo
Saturday 26 September
Palco Mundo: Rihanna, Sam Smith, Sheppard, Lulu Santos
Palco Sunset: Sérgio Mendes + Carlinhos Brown, Angélique Kidjo, Erasmo Carlos + Ultraje a Rigor, Brothers of Brazil
 Eletrônica: Matthias Tanzmann + Davide Squillace, DJ Vibe + Rui Vargas, Leo Janeiro + Leozinho, Conti + Mandi
Sunday 27 September
Palco Mundo: Katy Perry, A-ha, AlunaGeorge, Cidade Negra
Palco Sunset: Rio 450 Anos, Al Jarreau, Aurea + Boss AC, Suricato + Raul Midón
Eletrônica: Life is a Loop, Diego Miranda + Rodrigo Shà, Ely Yabu, Amanda Chang

Rock in Rio 7 (2017)
The seventh Brazilian edition was held in the City of Rock from September 15 to September 24, 2017. The headliners were Maroon 5, Justin Timberlake, Aerosmith, Bon Jovi, Guns N' Roses, The Who, and Red Hot Chili Peppers. Singer Lady Gaga was scheduled to perform on September 15, but had to cancel 24 hours before due to fibromyalgia. Maroon 5 performed a second concert due to her absence. Shawn Mendes and 5 Seconds of Summer also performed.

Rock in Rio 8 (2019)
The eight Brazilian edition was held from September 27 to October 6, 2019. It marked the first performance of singer Pink in Latin America

Rock in Rio 9 (2022)
The ninth edition of the Rock in Rio in Brazil took place between 2–11 September 2022.

Lisbon, Portugal, and Madrid, Spain

Rock in Rio Lisboa (2004)
After the huge success of Rock in Rio 3 in Brazil, Roberta Medina decided to organize a festival of the same stature in Lisbon. The decision to maintain the name Rock in Rio was controversial, and detractors of the idea in Brazil started calling it Rock in Rio Tejo, after the Tagus river (rio Tejo, in Portuguese) which runs through the Portuguese capital.

The first edition of Rock in Rio Lisboa, as the festival was officially called, took place in 2004. Although the festival had a slight change of name, it kept the same structure as the Brazilian editions. An entire City of Rock, with an area of over 260,000 audience was erected at the Bela Vista park, with a large centre stage and several tents where different artists would perform, simultaneously.

Full list of artists who performed at Rock in Rio Lisboa:

 28/05
 Paul McCartney
 29/05
 Peter Gabriel
 Ben Harper
 Jet
 Gilberto Gil
 Rui Veloso
 Nuno Norte
 30/05
 Foo Fighters
 Evanescence
 Seether
 Kings of Leon
 Charlie Brown Jr.
 Xutos & Pontapés
 4/06
 Metallica
 Incubus
 Slipknot
 Sepultura
 Moonspell

 5/06
 Britney Spears
 Black Eyed Peas
 Daniela Mercury
 Sugababes
 João Pedro Pais
 Nuno Norte
 6/6
 Sting
 Alicia Keys
 Pedro Abrunhosa
 Alejandro Sanz
 Ivete Sangalo
 Luís Represas

Rock in Rio Lisboa 2 (2006)
The second edition of Rock in Rio Lisboa was held in 2006, on 26/27 May and 2/3/4 June.
05/27 Friday
 Shakira
 Jamiroquai
 Ivete Sangalo
 D'ZRT
05/28 Saturday
 Guns N' Roses
 The Darkness
 Xutos e Pontapés
 Pitty
06/02 Friday
 Roger Waters
 Santana
 Rui Veloso
 Jota Quest
06/03 Saturday
 Red Hot Chili Peppers
 Da Weasel
 Kasabian
 Orishas
06/04 Sunday
 Sting
 Anastacia
 Corinne Bailey Rae
 Marcelo D2

Rock in Rio Lisboa & Madrid (2008)
The third edition of Rock in Rio took place in Lisbon, Portugal, on May 30, 31 and June 1 and 5–6. The dates for Arganda del Rey, Madrid, were June 27, 28 and July 4–6.

Rock in Rio Lisboa 3 
May 30
Paulo Gonzo
Ivete Sangalo
Amy Winehouse
Lenny Kravitz (and Daniel R.)

May 31
Skank
Alanis Morissette
Alejandro Sanz
Bon Jovi

June 1
Docemania
Just Girls
4 Taste
Xutos & Pontapés
Tokio Hotel
Joss Stone
Rod Stewart

June 5
Metallica
Machine Head
Apocalyptica
Moonspell

June 6
Linkin Park
The Offspring
Muse
Kaiser Chiefs
Orishas

Rock in Rio Madrid 
June 27
Alanis Morissette
Jack Johnson
Manolo García
Neil Young

June 28
Mando Diao
El Canto Del Loco
Tokio Hotel
Carlinhos Brown

July 4
Shakira
Jamiroquai
Amy Winehouse
Stereophonics

July 5
The Police
Alejandro Sanz
Estopa
Ivete Sangalo

July 6
Lenny Kravitz
Franz Ferdinand
Chris Cornell
Tiësto

Rock in Rio Lisboa & Madrid (2010)

Rock in Rio Lisboa 4 
May 21 / 82.000
Shakira
John Mayer
Ivete Sangalo
Mariza

May 22 / 45.000
Elton John
Trovante
Leona Lewis
2 MANY DJS LIVE
João Pedro Pais

May 27 / 85.000
Muse
Snow Patrol
Xutos & Pontapés
Fonzie (replaced Sum 41)
Sum 41 (canceled)

May 29 / 88.000
Miley Cyrus
McFly
D'ZRT
Amy Macdonald

May 30 / 38.000
Rammstein
Motörhead
Megadeth
Soulfly

Rock in Rio Madrid 2 
June 4 / 51.000
Bon Jovi
Paul van Dyk
Mägo de Oz (replaced John Mayer)
John Mayer (canceled)

June 5 / 90.000
Shakira
Rihanna
Calle 13
David Guetta

June 6 / 40.000
Miley Cyrus
McFly
Amy Macdonald

June 11 / 30.000
Rage Against the Machine
Jane's Addiction
Cypress Hill
Tiësto

June 14 / 48.000
Metallica
Motörhead
Sôber
Marillion

Rock in Rio Lisboa & Madrid (2012)

Rock in Rio Lisboa 5 
 5/25 Friday
 Palco Mundo: Metallica, Evanescence, Mastodon, Sepultura, Tambours Du Bronx
 Palco Sunset: Kreator + Andreas Kisser, Mão Morta + Pedro Laginha, Ramp + Teratron
 Eletrónica Heineken: Chase and Status, DJ Set & Rage, Dr Lectroluv, Life is a Loop, Leo Janeiro, Tha lovely Bastards (Mad Mac and Nuno Lopes), Bis Boys Please, MC Johnny Def
 Rock Street:
 5/26 Saturday
 Palco Mundo: Linkin Park, Smashing Pumpkins, The Offspring, Limp Bizkit
 Palco Sunset: Xutos & Titãs, Mafalda Veiga & Marcelo Jeneci, Rita Redshoes & Moreno Veloso
 Eletrónica Heineken: Azari & III, The Magician, Punks Jump Up, The Discotexas Band, Pedro Quintão, Mirror People (Rui Maia/X Wife), MC Johnny Def
 Rock Street:
 6/1 Friday
 Palco Mundo: Lenny Kravitz, Maroon 5, Ivete Sangalo, Expensive Soul
 Palco Sunset: Boss Ac & Zé Ricardo + Paula Lima, Orelha Negra + Hyldon + Kassin, Black Mamba & Tiago Bettencourt
 Eletrónica Heineken: Jamie Jones, Maceo Plex, Dyed Soundorom, Kings of Swingers (Renato Rathier + Mau Mau), Magazino, José Belo + Zé Salvador, MC Johnny Def
 Rock Street:
 6/2 Saturday
 Palco Mundo: Stevie Wonder, Bryan Adams, Joss Stone, The Gift
 Palco Sunset: Luis Represas & Joao Gil & Jorge Palma, Amor Electro & Moska, Ana Free + The Monomes
 Eletrónica Heineken: Masters at Work (Louie Vega + Kenny Dope Gonzales), The Martinez Brothers, JohnWaynes Live DJ, Miguel Rendeiro, DJ Poppy, MC Johnny Def
 Rock Street:
 6/3 Sunday
 Palco Mundo: Bruce Springsteen & The E Street Band, Xutos & Pontapés, James, Kaiser Chiefs
 Palco Sunset: Rui Veloso + Erasmo Carlos, David Fonseca + Convidado, Carminho + Convidado
 Eletrónica Heineken: DJ Harvey, DJ Vibe, Dop Live, DJ Dixon, Stereo Addiction, Mc Johnny Def
 Rock Street:

Rock in Rio Madrid 3 
 6/30 Saturday
 Maná, Lenny Kravitz, Luciano, Macaco
 7/5 Thursday
 Rihanna (canceled), Swedish House Mafia, Calvin Harris
 7/6 Friday — "Noche Electrónica"
 David Guetta, Pitbull, Erick Morillo, Pete Tong, Afrojack, Wally Lopez, Martin Solveig
 7/7 Saturday
 Red Hot Chili Peppers, Incubus, Gogol Bordello, Deadmau5

Rock in Rio Lisboa 6 (2014)

Rock in Rio Lisboa 7 (2016)
{| class="wikitable"
|+World Stage
|-
!May 19 (Thursday)
!May 20 (Friday)
!May 27 (Friday)
!May 28 (Saturday)
!May 29 (Sunday)
|-
|  style="text-align:center; vertical-align:top; width:200px;"|
Bruce Springsteen
 23:45
 Xutos & Pontapés
 22:00
 Stereophonics
 20:30
 Rock in Rio - the Musical
 19:00
|  style="text-align:center; vertical-align:top; width:200px;"|
Queen + Adam Lambert
 23:45
 Mika
 22:00
 Fergie
 20:30
 Rock in Rio - The Musical
 19:00
|  style="text-align:center; vertical-align:top; width:200px;"|
Hollywood Vampires
 23:45
 Korn
 22:00
 Rival Sons
 20:30
 Rock in Rio - The Musical
 19:00
|  style="text-align:center; vertical-align:top; width:200px;"|
Maroon 5
 23:45
 Ivete Sangalo 22:00
 D.A.M.A & Gabriel, o Pensador 20:30
 Rock in Rio the Musical 19:00
|  style="text-align:center; vertical-align:top; width:200px;"|Avicii 22:45
 Ivete Sangalo (replaced Ariana Grande)
 21:00
 Ariana Grande (cancelled)
 21:00
 Charlie Puth 19:30
 Rock in Rio - O Musical 18:00
|}

Rock in Rio Lisboa 8 (2018)

June 24 sold out almost three months prior to the festival.

Rock in Rio Lisboa 9 (2022)
The festival was originally set to take place in June 2020, but was postponed to 2021 and again to 2022 due to the COVID-19 pandemic.

Las Vegas

Rock in Rio USA (2015)
"Rock in Rio USA" was the first North American edition of the festival, being held in Las Vegas on May 8, 9, 15 and 16, 2015. The festival took place on two weekends, oriented towards rock and pop music. Rock Weekend took place on May 8 and 9, and Pop Weekend took place on May 15 and 16. It took place in the City of Rock (Las Vegas), located north of the Las Vegas Strip.Friday May 8Main Stage: No Doubt, Maná, The Pretty Reckless, Smallpools, Cirque du Soleil
Mercedes-Benz Evolution Stage: Foster the People, Gary Clark, Jr., Theophilus London, Saints of Valory
EDM Stage: AN21, Ftampa, Wax Motif, MVTHSaturday May 9Main Stage: Metallica, Linkin Park, Rise Against, Hollywood Undead
Mercedes-Benz Evolution Stage: Deftones, Sepultura featuring Steve Vai, Coheed & Cambria, Of Mice & Men
EDM Stage: Alok, Caked Up, The Gaslamp Killer, FelgukFriday May 15Main Stage: Taylor Swift, Ed Sheeran, Echosmith, Ivete Sangalo
Mercedes-Benz Evolution Stage: Jessie J, Charli XCX, Tove Lo, James Bay
EDM Stage: Heidi Lawden, Valida, Jeniluv, Whitney FierceSaturday May 16Main Stage:Bruno Mars, John Legend, Empire of the Sun, Big Sean
Mercedes-Benz Evolution Stage: Joss Stone, Magic!, Mayer Hawthorne, Mikky Ekko
EDM Stage: DJ Vibe', Lovefingers, Renato Ratier, Behrouz
 Live broadcasts 

The TV Globo Networks broadcast selected Rock in Rio concerts in Brazil, with cable affiliate Multishow broadcasting live concerts. In Nigeria, TNT and A&E broadcasts the festival live.

In Portugal, Rock in Rio Lisboa'' is broadcast by SIC Radical.

See also

List of historic rock festivals

References

Footnotes

Citations

External links

 

Pop music festivals
Brazilian rock music
Music festivals in Brazil
Music in Rio de Janeiro (city)
Rock festivals in Brazil
Rock festivals in Portugal
Rock festivals in Spain
Festivals in Rio de Janeiro
Music festivals in Rio de Janeiro (state)
Electronic music festivals in Spain
Electronic music festivals in Portugal
Electronic music festivals in Brazil
Music festivals established in 1985
1985 establishments in Brazil